The Devon Horse Show, also known as The Devon Horse Show and Country Fair is an annual horse show which has been held late May through early June in Devon, Pennsylvania since 1896. It is the oldest and largest outdoor multi-breed horse show in the U.S. The event serves as a fundraiser for Bryn Mawr Hospital.

Description
Since 1896, the Devon Horse Show is the oldest and largest outdoor multi-breed horse competition in the United States. The Annual Horse show and Country Fair promotes horsemanship and horse breeding for conformation, performance and speed. The original ideas and activities of the show have changed dramatically over the decades. The show attracts people from all over the world, as both competitors and spectators.

History 
The first horse show was held on July 2, 1896 as a one-day event held at the Devon Race track and Polo Grounds. The show consisted of thirty classes, the largest class having only ten entries. The fenced-in show ring was constructed on grass and the judges and officials sat in a gazebo in the center. Today, there is a fenced-in sand ring and there are at least five judges' booths or stands sitting on the outside of the main arena. The Devon Horse Show grounds hosts two main rings, the Dixon Oval and the Wheeler Ring. The Dixon Oval is the main arena surrounded by the grandstands with the famous gateway reading "Where Champions Meet." The smaller Wheeler Ring hosts the more populous classes such as pony breeding classes, USEF Medal, Regular Pony Hunters, as well as Local Hunters.

The Devon Horse Show has in-hand, jumpers, hunters, carriages, and gaited events.

Dressage at Devon is also held on the Devon Horse Show grounds, taking place September 26 through the 30th.

Cause

The Devon Horse Show, instituted just 3 years after the opening of Bryn Mawr Hospital, serves as the hospital's largest fund-raising event, beginning in 1919. Since 1972, Devon has contributed over $100 million to Bryn Mawr Hospital, to support projects such as the Emergency Center, the Maternal-Fetal Medicine program and the Outpatient Diagnostic Center.

References

External links
Devon Horse Show Official Site

Equestrian sports competitions in the United States
Show jumping events
Tourist attractions in Chester County, Pennsylvania
Equestrian sports in the United States
Sports competitions in Pennsylvania
1896 establishments in Pennsylvania